
Asiru Qucha (Aymara asiru snake, Quechua qucha lake,  Hispanicized spellings  Acero Cocha, Acero Khocha, Acero Q'ocha) is a Bolivian lake located in the Vacas Municipality, Arani Province, Cochabamba Department.

The main tributaries of Asiru Qucha are Asiru Qucha River, Chillawi P'ujru, Inka Mayu with Q'asa Mayu, Juq'ullu Mayu, and Pisqu Mayu.

See also 
 Phaqcha Mayu
 Parqu Qucha
 Qullpa Qucha
 Pilawit'u

References

External links 
 Population data and map of Vacas Municipality

Lakes of Cochabamba Department